General McCulloch may refer to:

Andrew McCulloch (British Army officer) (1876–1960), British Army major general
Benjamin McCulloch (1811–1862), Texas Militia major general and Confederate States Army brigadier general
Henry Eustace McCulloch (1816–1895), Confederate States Army brigadier general

See also
Arthur L. McCullough (1896–1979), U.S. Air Force brigadier general